Oni Wytars is an early music ensemble that was founded in 1983 by Marco Ambrosini and Peter Rabanser.

The Music 
Appearing in concerts and at festivals throughout Europe, Americas, Middle- and Far East they perform music of the Middle Ages and Renaissance as well as classical and traditional Arab and Turkish music. The focal point of Oni Wytars´ work is to unite the many traditions that have influenced and enriched European musical culture for centuries by building a bridge between ancient and still-thriving musical traditions, between Orient and Occident. ONI WYTARS is balancing on the edge between early and modern traditional music blending elements from both the rich cultural heritage of medieval Europe and from their own diverse backgrounds- the instrumentalists and singers come from Austria, Germany, Italy, France, Switzerland, Iran, Spain, UK and the U.S. - Oni Wytars has developed an intriguing performance style.

Instruments 
They perform on instruments from the European Middle Ages and Renaissance, and on contemporary Arabic and Eastern European folk instruments. These include vielle, rebec, pochette, nyckelharpa, vihuela d´arco, hurdy-gurdy, oud, baglama, harp, shawm,  cornett, chalumeau, ney, kaval, French and Bulgarian bagpipes, recorders, and Persian and Arabic percussion such as davul, zarb, bendir, darabukka and riqq.

Musicians 
 Marco Ambrosini - nyckelharpa, vielle, violino d´amore, harmonic flute, shawm
 Katharina Dustmann - zarb, darabuka, bendir, davul, riqq
 Peter Rabanser - oud, chalumeau, French and Bulgarian bagpipes, voice
 Riccardo Delfino - Celtic harp, arpa doppia, gothic harp, hurdy-gurdy, bagpipes
 Michael Posch - recorders and reedflutes
 Belinda Sykes -  voice, reed instruments 
 Ian Harrison - shawm, cornett, bagpipes
 Jane Achtman - vielle, viola da gamba
 Thomas Wimmer - vielle, viola da gamba
 Uschi Laar - harp
 Carlo Rizzo - tamburello
 Luigi Lai - Launeddas
 Jule Bauer - nyckelharpa,  voice
 Michael Behringer - organ
 Gabriella Aiello - voice
 Giovanna Pessi - harp
 Glen Velez - Frame Drums
Depending on the music and the occasion Oni Wytars play in different instrumentation and invite other musicians to play with them as guests from time to time.

Additional Ensembles 
In great demand as soloists, members of Oni Wytars collaborate on numerous recording and concert performances with internationally acclaimed artists and ensembles such as the "Clemencic Consort", "Accentus", "Ensemble Unicorn" (Austria), "Katharco Early Music Consort", "Sequentia" (Germany), "Els Trobadors" (Spain), Michael Riessler (Germany), Renaud-Garcia Fons (France), Glen Velez (USA).

Teachers 
The Ensemble Oni Wytars is teaching Early Music on the "Stages of Early Music" at the castle Burg Fürsteneck in Germany.

Discography
"Carmina Burana" Ensemble Oni Wytars & Unicorn Ensemble Vienna.
"On the way to Bethlehem" Ensemble Oni Wytars & Unicorn Ensemble Vienna. 
"Music of the Troubadours" Ensemble Oni Wytars, Unicorn Ensemble Vienna & Maria Laffitte
From Byzantium to Andalusia
Crai, crai, crai Ensemble Oni Wytars & Pascale van Coppenolle
Canto Novello Laude Ars Choralis Coeln & Ensemble Oni Wytars 
Mediterraneum
La Follia
Cantar d'amore
Pentameron

References

External links
http://www.oniwytars.de/
"Etappen Alter Musik" (Stages for Early Music at castle Burg Fürsteneck)

Instrumental early music groups
German musical groups
Arabic music
Turkish music
Musical groups established in 1983